The 1911 Victorian state election was held in the Australian state of Victoria on Thursday, 16 November 1911 to elect 56 of the 65 members of the state's Legislative Assembly. Nine seats were uncontested.

The election was in one member districts, using instant runoff (preferential) voting for the first time in the state's history. Women voted for the first time at this election.

Results

Legislative Assembly 

|}

See also
Candidates of the 1911 Victorian state election
Members of the Victorian Legislative Assembly, 1911–1914

References

1911 elections in Australia
Elections in Victoria (Australia)
1910s in Victoria (Australia)
November 1911 events